Esra Erol may refer to:
 Esra Erol (TV presenter) (born 1982), Turkish TV presenter
 Esra Erol (footballer) (born 1985), Turkish footballer